The West Virginia Railroad Museum is a railroad museum development located at 2 Railroad Avenue, WV 26241. The museum opened in 2014.

References

External links
West Virginia Railroad Museum website

Proposed museums in the United States
Railroad museums in West Virginia
Heritage railroads in West Virginia
Museums in Randolph County, West Virginia
Buildings and structures in Elkins, West Virginia